Nue Deh is a village in Kuhpayeh-e Gharbi Rural District, in the Central District of Abyek County, Qazvin Province, Iran. At the 2006 census, its population was 119, in 48 families.

References 

Populated places in Abyek County